Charles-Émile Kopp (3 March 1817 – 30 November 1875), French chemist, was born at Wasselonne, Alsace.

He became in 1847 a professor of toxicology and chemistry at the École supérieure de Pharmacie at Strasbourg. Because of his participation in the demonstration on "revolutionary day" 13 June 1849, he was forced to leave France, subsequently settling in Switzerland. In 1849 he became a professor of physics and chemistry at Lausanne, and in 1852 a chemist to a Turkey red factory near Manchester. In 1855 he was granted amnesty and returned to France. In 1868 he was named a professor of technology at Turin (Regio Museo Industriale italiano), and finally, in 1871, a professor of technical chemistry at the Federal Polytechnic Institute Zurich, today the ETH Zurich. He died in Zurich.

He conducted experiments  with arsenic acid as a discharge agent and filed patents for the employment of arsenic and phosphoric acids in discharge printing of fabrics. In 1844 he reportedly was the first to discover red phosphorus; his findings taking place prior to Anton Schrötter's discovery of the substance during the following year.

With Pompejus Bolley, he published "Traité des matières colorantes artificielles dérivées du goudron de houille" (1874, "Treatise on artificial dyes derived from coal tar").

See also
Aurantia
Styrene

Notes

References
; has a disambiguating addendum on Emil Kopp
 

 
 The American Chemist, Volumes 6-7 edited by Charles Frederick Chandler, William Henry Chandler.

External links

1817 births
1875 deaths
People from Bas-Rhin
19th-century French chemists
Academic staff of the University of Strasbourg
Academic staff of ETH Zurich
Academic staff of the University of Lausanne